Answer to the Master (1994) is the third full-length studio album by Impellitteri.

Track listing
All lyrics by Rob Rock, except where noted.  All music by Chris Impellitteri.
 "The Future Is Black" — 3:42
 "Fly Away" — 4:03
 "Warrior" — 4:04
 "I'll Wait" — 5:09 (Chris Impellitteri)
 "Hold the Line" — 4:01
 "Something's Wrong with the World Today" — 3:44 (Chris Impellitteri)
 "Answer to the Master" — 3:25
 "Hungry Days" — 3:10
 "The King Is Rising" — 3:33 (Chris Impellitteri)

Personnel
 Rob Rock – vocals
 Chris Impellitteri – guitar
 James Amelio Pulli – bass guitar except on track 4
 Ken Mary – drums
 Mike Smith – keyboard
 Chuck Wright – bass guitar on 4
 James Christian – backing vocals

References

External links

1994 albums
Impellitteri albums